Crossroads is an American drama television series created by James Steven Sadwith that aired on ABC from September 14, 1992 to July 15, 1993.

Premise
A district attorney from Manhattan and his rebellious son travel around America on a motorcycle.

Cast
Robert Urich as Johnny Hawkins
Dalton James as Dylan Hawkins
Georgia Allen as Judge Green (pilot)

Episodes

References

External links

1992 American television series debuts
1993 American television series endings
1990s American drama television series
English-language television shows
American Broadcasting Company original programming
Television series by Lorimar Television
Television shows set in Utah